Lelaps is a genus of Hymenoptera in the family Pteromalidae.

Species 
The following species are accepted within Lelaps:

 Lelaps abdominalis Ashmead, 1904
 Lelaps aeneiceps Ashmead, 1904
 Lelaps affinis Ashmead, 1904
 Lelaps albipes Cameron, 1884
 Lelaps albofasciatus Hedqvist, 1964
 Lelaps annulicornua (Strand, 1911) 
 Lelaps apicalis Ashmead, 1904
 Lelaps avicula Haliday, 1844
 Lelaps beckeri Yoshimoto, 1977
 Lelaps bimaculata Ashmead, 1904
 Lelaps callisto Marshall, 1892
 Lelaps caudatula (Strand, 1911) 
 Lelaps decorata Walker, 1862
 Lelaps ferrierei Hedqvist, 1964
 Lelaps ferruginea Cameron, 1884
 Lelaps flagellata (Strand, 1911) 
 Lelaps flavescens Ashmead, 1894
 Lelaps floridensis Yoshimoto, 1977
 Lelaps halidayi Ashmead, 1904
 Lelaps insularis Mercet, 1927
 Lelaps magnifica (Strand, 1911) 
 Lelaps melinus Yoshimoto, 1977
 Lelaps ornata (Strand, 1911) 
 Lelaps paraguayensis Girault, 1912
 Lelaps picta Walker, 1862
 Lelaps pulchella (Strand, 1911) 
 Lelaps pulchra Girault, 1912
 Lelaps pulchricornis Walker, 1843
 Lelaps pygata (Strand, 1911) 
 Lelaps rectivitta (Strand, 1911) 
 Lelaps rhomboidea (Strand, 1911) 
 Lelaps sadales (Walker, 1839) 
 Lelaps setifrons (Strand, 1911) 
 Lelaps simplex (Fabricius, 1804) 
 Lelaps striaticeps (Strand, 1911) 
 Lelaps striatus Yoshimoto, 1977
 Lelaps stylata Ashmead, 1904
 Lelaps terebrans (Strand, 1911) 
 Lelaps tibialis Cameron, 1884
 Lelaps viridiceps (Strand, 1911) 
 Lelaps vittipennis (Strand, 1911)

References 

Pteromalidae
Insects described in 1843